Flavius Sporacius (fl. 5th century) was a statesman of the Eastern Roman Empire.

He served as Comes in 448, and Comes domesticorum peditum in 450 and 451, in which capacity he attended some of the Council of Chalcedon in October 451. He was consul for 452, which was probably not recognized by the West.

References
 

Comites domesticorum
Imperial Roman consuls
5th-century Byzantine people
5th-century Roman consuls